Sukholomovo is a rural locality (a village) in Lyubomirovskoye Rural Settlement, Sheksninsky District, Vologda Oblast, Russia. The population was 24 as of 2002.

Geography 
Sukholomovo is located 34 km southeast of Sheksna (the district's administrative centre) by road. Kuryakovo is the nearest rural locality.

References 

Rural localities in Sheksninsky District